The Legend is a compilation album by Joe Cocker, released in 1992 by Polygram TV.

Track listing
Source: Album cover
 "Up Where We Belong" (with Jennifer Warnes)  (Jack Nitzsche, Buffy Sainte-Marie, Will Jennings) from the soundtrack album An Officer and a Gentleman
 "With a Little Help from My Friends" (John Lennon, Paul McCartney) from the album With a Little Help from My Friends
 "Delta Lady" (Leon Russell) from the album Joe Cocker!
 "The Letter" (Wayne Carson Thompson) from the album Mad Dogs and Englishmen
 "She Came In Through the Bathroom Window" (John Lennon, Paul McCartney) from the album Joe Cocker!
 "A Whiter Shade Of Pale" (Gary Brooker, Keith Reid, Matthew Fisher) from the album Luxury You Can Afford
 Love the One You're With" (live) (Stephen Stills) from the album Live in L.A.
 "You Are So Beautiful" (Billy Preston, Bruce Fisher) from the album I Can Stand a Little Rain
 "Let It Be" (John Lennon, Paul McCartney) from the CD version of the album Joe Cocker!
 "Just Like a Woman" (Bob Dylan) from the album With a Little Help from My Friends
 ""Many Rivers to Cross" (Jimmy Cliff) from the album Sheffield Steel
 "Talking Back To The Night" (Steve Winwood and Will Jennings) from the album Sheffield Steel
 "Fun Time" (Allen Toussaint) from the album Luxury You Can Afford
 "I Heard It Through The Grapevine" (Norman Whitfield, Barrett Strong) from the album Luxury You Can Afford
 "Please Give Peace a Chance" (live) (Leon Russell, Bonnie Bramlett) from the album Mad Dogs and Englishmen
 "Don't Let Me Be Misunderstood" (Gloria Caldwell, Sol Marcus, Bennie Benjamin) from the album With a Little Help from My Friends
 "Honky Tonk Women" (live) (Mick Jagger, Keith Richards) from the album Mad Dogs and Englishmen
 Cry Me a River" (live) (Arthur Hamilton) from the album Mad Dogs and Englishmen

Chart performance

References

1992 compilation albums
Joe Cocker compilation albums